The European Federation of Financial Analysts Societies (EFFAS) is the federation of analysts associations in Europe. EFFAS is the umbrella organisation of 14 national, local societies of investment professionals in Europe.

EFFAS represents more than 18,000 Financial Analysts, Asset Managers, Pension Fund Managers, Corporate Finance Specialists, Risk Managers, Treasurers and other professional profiles in the investment professions.

EFFAS was founded in 1962 and its headquarters is located in  Frankfurt, Germany. EFFAS is a not-for-profit organisation. Its mission is to set the requirement standards for investment professionals, to act as a think tank and centre for discussion and be a European reference in Training & Qualifications.

EFFAS promotes the development and dissemination of a European Code of Ethics and Professional Conduct and recognizes and respects regional and local market characteristics.

EFFAS Certifications

EFFAS is a leading association and pioneer in certifications and qualifications for finance professionals:

1.	The Certified European Financial Analyst Diploma (CEFA) was set up in 1991. Since its introduction, the CEFA diploma has become one of the most respected and recognized professional credentials in the world, known as the “gold standard” among financial industry professionals in Europe. It is accredited in 15 European countries as well as in Argentina and Brazil and is well recognized by employers. To date, over 16,300 professionals in Europe are CEFA holders.. Our Diploma respects local market requirements, conditions, and characteristics as well as individual cultures. Find all the information regarding the CEFA certification here. 

2.	The Certified Environmental Social and Governance Analysts (CESGA) designation, ensuring professional qualification by offering globally as well as local market knowledge within its examination structure. EFFAS also provides services for capital market experts through national member societies. Find all the information regarding the CESGA certification here.

3.	The EFFAS ESG Essentials certification provides participants with the fundamental concepts and requirements to give basic guidance to investors in ESG matters. Professionals in the sector can demonstrate that they have acquired an understanding of the fundamentals of ESG to complement their professional knowledge. Find all the information regarding the ESG Essentials certification here.

4.	The EFFAS Digital Assets & MiCA (DiAM) is the newest EFFAS certification that will be launched in 2023. Throughout this programme we will review the essential elements of this technology, along with the use cases it generates for business and the regulation that will order these elements. Students who pass the programme will have the necessary training to be able to understand the novelties in this field and outline the essential attributes of the projects and activities that are developed in a financial institution with respect to crypto assets. Find all the information regarding the EFFAS Digital Assets & MiCA (DiAM) here.

EFFAS Commission

1.	EFFAS Commission on ESG (CESG): For years, EFFAS has had a strong position in developing standards for the reporting of extra-financials. With its Commission on Intellectual Capital (CIC) and its Commission on ESG (CESG) EFFAS not only has been instrumental in communicating the needs of investment professionals in capital markets to corporates but has also provided practical advice in the form of Key Performance Indicators and interactive data formats. Thus, EFFAS has helped to enhance the integration of extra-financials in classic investment methods. Read more information about the EFFAS CESG  here.

2.	EFFAS Capital Markets Commission (CMC): The role of the capital markets is key for the allocation of financial resources throughout modern economies and therefore to enable stronger growth and the long-term development of the European economies. Over the last few years and especially after the world financial crisis of 2007, which significantly affected the banking system in many countries, European authorities have placed the efficiency of capital markets at the centre of their priorities. This is demonstrated by the launch and implementation of the Capital Markets Union (CMU), a priority within the agenda of the EU Commission. Read more information about the EFFAS CMC here.

3.	The EFFAS Commission on Financial Reporting (CFR) provides analysts’ views on the definition of International Financial Reporting Standards (IFRS) to international accounting standards setters. Its members work closely with the International Accounting Standard Board (IASB) through the Global Analysts’ group and the European Financial Reporting Advisory Group (EFRAG) through the Users’ Panel. EFRAG provides advice to the European Commission on issues related to the implantation in Europe of IFRS. Read more information about the EFFAS CFR here.

4.	The EFFAS Commission on Training & Qualification (TQC) is a standing commission of EFFAS. Its main tasks are to provide advice to the European Management Committee of EFFAS on all issues relating to training and qualification, and to evaluate the accreditations of professional designations at EFFAS and its national member societies with its Review Panel. Read more information about the EFFAS TQC here.

Member societies

External links
effas.com

References

Business and finance professional associations
Analyst societies